Iuchi (written: 井内) is a Japanese surname. Notable people with the surname include:

, Japanese graphic designer
, Japanese composer and arranger
, Japanese anime director

References

Japanese-language surnames